The following highways are numbered 7A:

India
  }National Highway 7A (India)

United States
 Massachusetts Route 7A
 New York State Route 7A
 County Route 7A (Allegany County, New York)
 County Route 7A (Nassau County, New York)
 County Route 7A (Schoharie County, New York)
 Oklahoma State Highway 7A
 Vermont Route 7A